Ramchandrapur is an administrative block/Tehsil/Taluka of Balrampur district, in the Indian state of Chhattisgarh.

Geography
Ramchandarpur is located 70 km North from District headquarters Balrampur, Chhattisgarh. Ramchandrapur Tehsil Headquarters is the Ramchadrapur town.

Ramchandrapur Tehsil is bounded by China Tehsil towards the East, Ranka Tehsil towards the East, Wadrafnagar Tehsil towards the west, Dandai Tehsil towards the North. Garhwa City, Renukoot City, Daltonganj City, Kota City are nearby cities.	

It is 533m elevation (altitude). It sits on the border of the Surguja District and Garhwa District. Garhwa District Chinia is East towards it. Ramchandarpur is near to the Jharkhand State Border.

Amenities 
Notable tourist attractions include Surguja, Betla National Park, Palamu, Ambikapur and Rohtasgarh Fort.

See also
 Balrampur district, Chhattisgarh
 Ramanujganj

Reference 

Community development blocks in Balrampur district, Chhattisgarh
Community development blocks in Chhattisgarh
Cities and towns in Balrampur district, Chhattisgarh